Jackson is a town in Northampton County, North Carolina, United States. The population was 513 at the 2010 census. It is the county seat of Northampton County.

Jackson is part of the Roanoke Rapids, North Carolina Micropolitan Statistical Area.

History

The Amis-Bragg House, Church of the Saviour and Cemetery, Jackson Historic District, Mowfield, Northampton County Courthouse Square, and Verona are listed on the National Register of Historic Places.

Geography
Jackson is located at  (36.390317, -77.422193).

Climate

Demographics

2020 census

As of the 2020 United States census, there were 430 people, 245 households, and 142 families residing in the town.

2000 census
As of the census of 2000, there were 695 people, 218 households, and 148 families residing in the town. The population density was 683.8 people per square mile (263.1/km2). There were 243 housing units at an average density of 239.1 per square mile (92.0/km2). The racial makeup of the town was 51.94% White, 47.63% African American, 0.14% Asian, 0.14% from other races, and 0.14% from two or more races. Hispanic or Latino of any race were 0.29% of the population.

There were 218 households, out of which 27.5% had children under the age of 18 living with them, 48.2% were married couples living together, 15.6% had a female householder with no husband present, and 31.7% were non-families. 28.9% of all households were made up of individuals, and 18.3% had someone living alone who was 65 years of age or older. The average household size was 2.41 and the average family size was 2.97.

In the town, the population was spread out, with 18.4% under the age of 18, 7.2% from 18 to 24, 24.5% from 25 to 44, 22.3% from 45 to 64, and 27.6% who were 65 years of age or older. The median age was 45 years. For every 100 females, there were 97.4 males. For every 100 females age 18 and over, there were 96.2 males.

The median income for a household in the town was $29,375, and the median income for a family was $34,000. Males had a median income of $27,917 versus $18,875 for females. The per capita income for the town was $14,588. About 18.6% of families and 19.8% of the population were below the poverty line, including 31.3% of those under age 18 and 10.8% of those age 65 or over.

Education
The elementary school serving Jackson is Central Elementary School. CES is the newest school in Northampton County; it opened it doors for the 2006-2007 school year.  It combined Seaboard Coates Elementary and Jackson Eastside Elementary schools.

Also housed in Jackson is the Central Services building for Northampton County Schools. Northampton County Schools is the local educational agency for the district.  The system includes 7 schools.

References

Towns in Northampton County, North Carolina
Towns in North Carolina
County seats in North Carolina
Roanoke Rapids, North Carolina micropolitan area
Historic Albemarle Tour